Emil Damirovich Sayfutdinov (born 26 October 1989) is a motorcycle speedway rider from Russia. He is a member of the Russia national speedway team. He is a three times World team champion, twice World Junior champion and a two-time winner of the European Championships in 2014 and 2015.

Career history
2005
Sayfutdinov gained his speedway licence in 2005, just before his 16th birthday. He started his career in the Russian league with Mega-Lada Togliatti. His team won the Russian Champion title, and Sayfutdinov was one Mega-Lada's best riders with an average of 2.271 (15th place in league). He won the Individual under-21 Russian Championship and was 6th in the Russian Senior Championship. He also won the Russian Pairs Championship title with Mega-Lada that year.

In international competitions he started in Individual U-19 European Championship. In Semi-Final C in Daugavpils, Latvia he was won qualification to the Final. But he was too young and was not allowed to take part – the minimum age of a rider is 16 years of age at the start of each year.

2006

In 2006, he signed for Polish team Polonia Bydgoszcz, the then Polish League Runner-up. On 9 April 2006, he rode in his first meeting in the Polish Ekstraliga (Wrocław vs Bydgoszcz 53:37). He started in only one heat – finishing last behind Tomasz Gapiński, Hans N. Andersen and Piotr Protasiewicz. On 23 March 2006, (Bydgoszcz vs Tarnów 44:46) he scored his first points in the Ekstraliga (finishing second behind with his teammate Krzysztof Buczkowski, he beat Paweł Hlib and Kamil Zieliński). Polonia Bydgoszcz finished 3rd in Polish Championship - Emil's Average was 1.353 (38th place). He started in Team U-21 Polish Championship – Polonia finished 2nd place in Qualifying Group C. Sayfutdinov did not race in the Russian league in 2006, therefore he could not defend his titles, and the Motorcycle Federation of Russia did not nominate him for any international competitions.

2007

In 2007, Sayfutdinov remained with Polonia Bydgoszcz in Poland. It was very bad season for Bydgoszcz – they finished last in the Ekstraliga and were relegated from the top division for first time in their history. Sayfutdinov's average was 1.463 (36th place). He also made his debut in the Swedish Elitserien with Masarna Avesta who finished in 5th place in league.

He returned to Russian league in 2007 with Mega-Lada Togliatti. Sayfutdinov won the Russian League Championship title and a bronze medal in Russian Pairs Championship. Mega-Lada took part in the European Club Champions' Cup – Sayfutdinov scored 0 points – but his team came 3rd in final. In the Individual under-21 Russian Championship he finished second.

In June, Sayfutdinov took part in the Team U-21 World Championship. Sayfutdinov was Russia's top points scorer in the Qualifying Round 1, but Russia finished last and were knocked out of the competition. With the senior team – in July – he participated in the 2007 Speedway World Cup with Russia, finishing in sixth place. After winning the quarter and semi-finals, he qualified to the Individual U-21 World Championship Final. On 9 September 2007, Emil Sayfutdinov became the World Under-21 Champion for the first time with a 15-point maximum score, breaking the track record twice during the meeting.

2008
In 2008, Sayfutdinov remained with Polonia Bydgoszcz in Polish First League (second division). Polonia won league were promoted back to the Ekstraliga. In Swedish Elitserien he rode for Masarna Avesta, who were relegated after finishing the season in last place. In Russia, with Mega-Lada Togliatti, he won league championship title again. Sayfutdinov won Individual U-21 Russian Champion title and won the silver medal in the Russian Senior Championship. With Mega-Lada he took part in the European Club Champions' Cup Final and won the European Club title.

In June, he started in Team U-21 World Championship Qualifying Round 1, but the Russian team finished last again. In July, he participated in the 2008 Speedway World Cup. In the semi-final he was the top point scorer for Russia with 14 points. Sayfutdinov did not take part in the race-off because he was taking part in the Individual U-21 World Championship Semi-Final, where he won qualification to the final. On 4 October 2008, he defended his World Under-21 Champion title, becoming the first rider to ever do so. In the final he beat Chris Holder again, and Jurica Pavlic.

He started in the 2009 Speedway Grand Prix Qualification, but in the "Qualifying Round 3" he finished 8th and was knocked out of the competition. On 2008-10-28 Speedway Grand Prix Promoter and the SGP Commission nominated him as "permanent wild card" to 2009 Speedway Grand Prix.

2009
2009 was Sayfutdinov's first season in the Speedway Grand Prix (SGP) and at 19 years old, he is the youngest permanent rider in SGP history. He made his debut on 25 April at the Czech Grand Prix in Prague. In his first heat (heat 3), he was second  to Jason Crump. In heat 15, he won his first SGP heat – beating Grzegorz Walasek, Sebastian Ułamek and Chris Harris. Sayfutdinov qualified for the final which he won, making him the youngest ever rider to win a Grand Prix. On 27 June at the British GP in Cardiff, on heat 5 Emil had a fight on the track with Scott Nicholls. The final round of 2009 season will be at his home track in Bydgoszcz, Poland. He won 3 Grand Prix and finish 3 overall in his first season at the sport top-level competition.

During the 2009 season he rode for Polonia Bydgoszcz, Piraterna, Vojens and Turbina Balakovo. Sayfutdinov with Denis Gizatullin and Andrey Kudryashov was won Pairs Russia Cup for Turbina Balakovo; Emil scored maximum 16 points and 2 bonus in six heats.

2010
Emil started the season in the best way with a third place in the Polish Grand Prix in Leszno.
But in the Czech Grand Prix, Emil was involved in a serious crash, and he broke his arm.
After a break, he was back, ready to fight in the Grand Prix in Malilla, Sweden.  He started out making two 3rd places and then two 2nd places before he crashed again, and broke his arm once again.
After that, he did not race again in the Grand Prix that year

2011
He started out with a 3rd place, just like the previous year, in the first Grand Prix in Leszno. That was his only time on the podium until last round in Gorzow where he made another 3rd place. He was 6th overall in the Grand Prix for 2011 which was enough to be one of the eight best and automatically qualify for the 2012 Grand Prix. Sayfutdinov resigned from the Individual U-21 World Championship, because of the heavy race schedule. Sayfutdinov was nominated to Russia team to Team U-21 World Championship Qualifying Round 2, but Russia was withdrew. In July, he will be participated in the 2009 Speedway World Cup for Russia.

2014
An injury and financial costs forced Emil Sayfutdinov to withdraw from Speedway Grand Prix Series, he joined the European Championships Series (SEC). He won the 2014 European Championships.

2015
Sayfutdinov won in 2015 again the European Championship.

2017
After three years away from the World Championships, Sayfutdinov return to the series, he finish sixth in the championships.

2018
Sayfutdinov finished 8th in the 2018 World Championship but won a gold medal with Russia in the 2018 Speedway of Nations (the World Team Championship).

2019
Sayfutdinov finished third and won his second bronze medal in the 2019 World Championship, finishing with 126 points. He won his second gold medal with Russia in the 2019 Speedway of Nations (the World Team Championship).

2020
He finished 8th in the 2020 World Championship but won his third consecutive gold medal with Russia in the 2020 Speedway of Nations (the World Team Championship).

2021
Sayfutdinov finished third and won his third bronze medal in the 2021 World Championship, finishing with 140 points.

2022
In 2022, Sayfutdinov was unable to compete for the world title following the Fédération Internationale de Motocyclisme ban on Russian and Belarusian motorcycle riders, teams, officials, and competitions as a result of the 2022 Russian invasion of Ukraine.

2023
In 2023, he joined the Ipswich Witches for the SGB Premiership 2023 by virtue of having a Polish licence and dual citizenship and therefore overcoming the ban on Russian riders.

Personal life
His parents are Tatar father Damir and Russian mother Tamara; his brother, Denis (born 2 June 1981) is also a speedway rider. Denis was a member of the Russian team during the 2002 Speedway World Cup and 2004 Speedway World Cup Qualification.

In March 2009, Sayfutdinov gained Polish citizenship. Before the 2010 season, his Polish club Polonia Bydgoszcz applied to Main Commission of Speedway Sport (GKSŻ) for him to be exempt from the Polish speedway licence (Licencja "Ż") exam based on his individual honours (including bronze medal in the 2009 Speedway Grand Prix and two Individual Speedway Junior World Championship titles). GKSŻ excepted him and on April 22, 2010, confirmed Sayfutdinov as domestic rider and known as Emil Sajfutdinow. In the Speedway Ekstraliga minimum three riders must have Polish licency. In international competitions he will continue to represent Russia.

He currently lives at the Zielona Tarasy (Green Terrace) residential estate in Bydgoszcz, Poland.

Major results

World individual Championship
2009 Speedway Grand Prix - 3rd (including Czech Rep, Swedish and Slovenian grand prix wins)
2010 Speedway Grand Prix - 15th
2011 Speedway Grand Prix - 6th
2012 Speedway Grand Prix - 5th
2013 Speedway Grand Prix - 6th (including European, British and Swedish grand prix wins)
2017 Speedway Grand Prix - 6th
2018 Speedway Grand Prix - 8th
2019 Speedway Grand Prix - 3rd (including Swedish grand prix win)
2020 Speedway Grand Prix - 8th
2021 Speedway Grand Prix - 3rd

World team championships
2007 Speedway World Cup - 6th
2008 Speedway World Cup - 6th
2009 Speedway World Cup - 4th
2011 Speedway World Cup - 5th
2012 Speedway World Cup - 3rd
2016 Speedway World Cup - 6th
2017 Speedway World Cup - 3rd
2018 Speedway of Nations - Winner
2019 Speedway of Nations - Winner
2020 Speedway of Nations - Winner

World junior championships
 Individual U-21 World Championship (Under-21 World Championship)
 2007 -  Ostrów Wlkp. - World Champion (15 points)
 2008 -  Pardubice - World Champion (14 points)
 Team U-21 World Championship (U-21 Speedway World Cup)
 2007 - 4th place in Qualifying Round 2
 2008 - 4th place in Qualifying Round 1
 2009 - team withdrew from Qualifying Round 2

European Championships
 European Club Champions' Cup
 2007 -  Miskolc - 3rd place (0 points)
 2008 -  Slaný - Winner (13 points)

Domestic competitions
 Individual Speedway Russian Junior Championship
 2005 - Winner
 2007 - Silver medal
 2008 - Winner
 Russian Pairs Speedway Championship
 2005 - Winner
 2007 - Bronze medal
 2009 - Winner
 Team Polish Championship
 2006 - 3rd with Bydgoszcz
 2007 - 8th place with Bydgoszcz
 2008 - First League winner with Bydgoszcz
 Russian League Championship
 2005 - Winner
 2007 - Winner
 2008 - Winner
 2009 - Winner
 Polish Team U-21 Championship
 2006 - 2nd place in Qualification Group C

See also
 Russia national speedway team
 List of Speedway Grand Prix riders

References

1989 births
Living people
People from Salavat
Russian speedway riders
Polish speedway riders
Polonia Bydgoszcz riders
Coventry Bees riders
Ipswich Witches riders
Russian emigrants to Poland
Tatar people of Russia
Naturalized citizens of Poland
Sportspeople from Bashkortostan